Mein Lieber Katrina Catches a Convict is a 1914 American silent comedy short starring Charlotte Burton, Harry De Vere, Perry Banks, Edith Borella, Ida Lewis, and John Steppling. The film is the sequel to Mein Lieber Katrina.

External links

1914 films
1914 comedy films
Silent American comedy films
American silent short films
American black-and-white films
1914 short films
American comedy short films
1910s American films